Elections to Dungannon and South Tyrone Borough Council were held on 5 May 2005 on the same day as the other Northern Irish local government elections. The election used four district electoral areas to elect a total of 22 councillors.

Election results

Note: "Votes" are the first preference votes.

Districts summary

|- class="unsortable" align="centre"
!rowspan=2 align="left"|Ward
! % 
!Cllrs
! % 
!Cllrs
! %
!Cllrs
! %
!Cllrs
! % 
!Cllrs
!rowspan=2|TotalCllrs
|- class="unsortable" align="center"
!colspan=2 bgcolor="" | Sinn Féin
!colspan=2 bgcolor="" | DUP
!colspan=2 bgcolor="" | UUP
!colspan=2 bgcolor="" | SDLP
!colspan=2 bgcolor="white"| Others
|-
|align="left"|Blackwater
|24.4
|1
|bgcolor="#D46A4C"|41.6
|bgcolor="#D46A4C"|2
|21.6
|1
|12.4
|1
|0.0
|0
|5
|-
|align="left"|Clogher Valley
|bgcolor="#008800"|32.2
|bgcolor="#008800"|2
|27.9
|1
|20.9
|1
|18.9
|1
|0.0
|0
|5
|-
|align="left"|Dungannon Town
|bgcolor="#008800"|35.2
|bgcolor="#008800"|2
|28.1
|2
|20.6
|1
|16.1
|1
|0.0
|0
|6
|-
|align="left"|Torrent
|bgcolor="#008800"|60.9
|bgcolor="#008800"|4
|4.8
|0
|9.6
|1
|12.5
|1
|12.2
|1
|6
|- class="unsortable" class="sortbottom" style="background:#C9C9C9"
|align="left"| Total
|39.6
|9
|24.3
|5
|17.6
|4
|14.8
|4
|3.7
|0
|22
|-
|}

District results

Blackwater

2001: 2 x UUP, 1 x DUP, 1 x Sinn Féin, 1 x SDLP
2005: 2 x DUP, 1 x UUP, 1 x Sinn Féin, 1 x SDLP
2001-2005 Change: DUP gain from UUP

Clogher Valley

2001: 2 x Sinn Féin, 1 x DUP, 1 x UUP, 1 x SDLP
2005: 2 x Sinn Féin, 1 x DUP, 1 x UUP, 1 x SDLP
2001-2005 Change: No change

Dungannon Town

2001: 2 x Sinn Féin, 2 x UUP, 1 x DUP, 1 x SDLP
2005: 2 x Sinn Féin, 2 x DUP, 1 x UUP, 1 x SDLP
2001-2005 Change: DUP gain from UUP

Torrent

2001: 3 x Sinn Féin, 1 x SDLP, 1 x UUP, 1 x Independent
2005: 4 x Sinn Féin, 1 x SDLP, 1 x UUP
2001-2005 Change: Sinn Féin gain from Independent

References

Dungannon and South Tyrone Borough Council elections
Dungannon and South Tyrone